Spotlight Kid may refer to:

Spotlight Kid (band), an English shoegaze band
The Spotlight Kid, a 1972 album by Captain Beefheart
"Spotlight Kid", a song by Rainbow on their 1981 album Difficult to Cure